Besstrond is an area in Vågå, Norway, on a hillside between Nedre Sjodalsvatnet and Øvre Sjodalsvatnet.

Vågå